The Rochester Knighthawks were a lacrosse team based in Rochester, New York, that played in the National Lacrosse League (NLL). The 2019 season was the 25th and final in franchise history. The roster and personnel were moved to Halifax for the 2020 season to form the Halifax Thunderbirds, while Pegula Sports and Entertainment took over  an expansion franchise in Rochester, retaining the team's intellectual property.

Regular season

Final standings

Game log

Roster

Entry draft
The 2018 NLL Entry Draft took place on September 25, 2018. The Knighthawks made the following selections:

See also
2019 NLL season

References

Rochester Knighthawks seasons
Rochester
Rochester Knighthawks